New Music Canada, Vol. 1 is a compilation album released in 2004 by CBC Records. This release features songs from New Music Canada (CBC Radio 3).

Track listing
 Audio Lava, "Leaf" (3:59)
 Insurgent, "Dissolving Behaviour" (4:45)
 Danny Dopamine, "Vo Code Her" (4:24)
 Madrid, "Stereostar" (5:01)
 Dragon Fli Empire, "Mount Pleasant" (4:17)
 Butta Babees, "Man ’n Motion" (4:21)
 Fun 100, "Computer" (2:21)
 Atlas Strategic, "Jeered by Minor Demon" (2:48)
 Cripple Creek Fairies, "Greenroom" (1:38)
 Tigre Benvie, "My Father Moved Through Dooms of Love" (5:09)
 Litterbug, "Oh You Are So Beautiful" (2:15)
 Music for Mapmakers, "Don’t Know What You’re Trying To Say" (2:00)
 White Star Line, "Sniffer’s Row" (2:20)
 Orange Glass, "How Fast is Too Fast" (2:16)
 The Paperbacks, "Grey Skies" (2:58)
 Bucky Quagmire, "Double Feature" (3:06)

References 

CBC Radio 3 compilation albums
2004 compilation albums